Nanguan District is one of seven districts of the prefecture-level city of Changchun, the capital of Jilin Province, Northeast China, and forms part of the urban core. It borders the districts of Kuancheng to the north, Erdao to the northeast, Shuangyang to the southeast, Chaoyang to the west, and the prefecture-level city of Siping to the south.

Administrative divisions
There are 12 subdistricts, three towns, and two townships.

Subdistricts:
Nanjie Subdistrict, Taoyuan Subdistrict, Quan'an Subdistrict, Yongji Subdistrict, Shuguang Subdistrict, Nanling Subdistrict, Ziqiang Subdistrict, Minkang Subdistrict, Panshi Subdistrict, Qingming Subdistrict, Xinchun Subdistrict, Xiwu Subdistrict

Towns:
Jingyue, Xinlicheng, Xinhu

Townships:
Xinfu Township, Nonglin Township

References

External links

County-level divisions of Jilin
Changchun